The Monastery of Epiphanius is a monastery near in Luxor Governorate, Egypt, near the regional capital Luxor (ancient Thebes). It was founded by an anchorite named Epiphanius towards the end of the sixth century.

It was explored by an expedition from the Metropolitan Museum of Art, 1912–14.

Further reading
 Herbert E. Winlock & Walter E. Crum: The Monastery of Epiphanus at Thebes. Part I: The Literary Material, New York, 1926.
 Walter Ewing Crum & Hugh G. Evelyn White:  The Monastery of Epiphanus at Thebes. Part II: The Archaeological Material, New York, 1926.
 Scott Bucking: "Scribes and Schoolmasters? On contextualizing Coptic and Greek Ostraca excavated at the Monastery of Epiphanius". In: Journal of Coptic Studies; 9 (2007) pp. 21–47.
 Catherine Thirard: Le monastère d'Épiphane à Thèbes: nouvelle interprétation chronologique. In: Études coptes; IX (= Cahiers de la Bibliothèque Copte; 14). De Boccard, Paris, 2006, pp. 367–374.

External links
A detailed excavation report on the Monastery of Epiphanius

Epiphanius, monastery of
Buildings and structures in Luxor Governorate